Robinson Crusoe is a 1927 British silent drama film produced and directed by M.A. Wetherell who also played the title role.  The film also stars Fay Compton and Herbert Waithe. It is an adaptation of the 1719 novel Robinson Crusoe by Daniel Defoe. The screenplay concerns a shipwrecked man stranded on a desert island. The film was made at Cricklewood Studios and Lime Grove Studios in London.

Cast 
M.A. Wetherell as Robinson Crusoe
Fay Compton as Sophie Bruce
Herbert Waithe as Man Friday
Reginald Fox

External links 

1927 films
1927 adventure films
1920s historical films
British black-and-white films
British adventure films
British historical films
British silent feature films
Films based on Robinson Crusoe
Films directed by M. A. Wetherell
Films shot at Cricklewood Studios
Films about survivors of seafaring accidents or incidents
British drama films
1927 drama films
1920s English-language films
1920s British films
Silent drama films
Silent adventure films